Samuel Rohrer LeCure (born May 4, 1984) is an American former professional baseball relief pitcher. He attended Helias High School in Jefferson City, Missouri and the University of Texas. He played in Major League Baseball (MLB) for the Cincinnati Reds.

College career
With the University of Texas in 2003, in 16 games pitched including six starts, LeCure went 5-0 with a 3.74 ERA. The Longhorns posted an overall record of 50-20, advancing to the 2003 College World Series, where they finished in a tie for third place. In 2004, he pitched 24 games, all but one of them as a starter, and went 9-3 with a 2.34 ERA as the Longhorns went 58-15. They again advanced to the College World Series, where they finished as the national runner-up to Cal State Fullerton.

Draft
He was originally drafted by the Philadelphia Phillies out of high school in the 45th round of the 2002 amateur draft but did not sign. He was then drafted and signed by the Reds in the fourth round of the 2005 amateur draft.

Minor league career
LeCure began his minor league career in 2005 with the Billings Mustangs, going 5-1 with a 3.27 ERA in 13 games (six starts). In 41 innings, he posted 44 strikeouts.

For the Sarasota Reds in 2006, he went 7-12 with a 3.43 ERA in 27 starts. In 2007, he started one game for the Sarasota Reds and spent the rest of the season with the Chattanooga Lookouts, going a combined 8-5 with a 4.07 ERA in 22 starts.

He repeated AA-ball in 2008 with Chattanooga, going 9-7 with a 3.42 ERA in 27 starts. LeCure spent the entire 2009 season pitching for AAA Louisville Bats, going 10-8 with a 4.46 ERA in 25 starts.

Major league career

Cincinnati Reds
LeCure was called up to Cincinnati Reds on May 26, 2010, temporarily replacing an injured Homer Bailey on the roster. LeCure made his major league debut in a start for the Reds on Friday, May 28, 2010 against the Houston Astros. He pitched six innings and gave up two runs and six hits with four walks while striking out five batters as the Reds won 15-6. LeCure ended his rookie season with a 2-5 record and a 4.50 ERA and 37 strikeouts in 48 innings.

In 2012, LeCure pitched 77.2 innings, with a 2-1 record, a 3.71 earned run average and 73 strikeouts. In 2012, he posted a 3-3 record with a 3.14 ERA and 61 strikeouts in 48 games. That year, in three postseason games he yielded only two hits and no runs as the Reds finally fell to the San Francisco Giants, the eventual World Series champions.

In 2013, LeCure went 2-1 with a career-best 2.66 ERA in 63 games with 61 innings pitched, striking out 66.

In 2014, LeCure posted a 3.81 ERA, the worst since his rookie season. He gave up 62 hits in 56.2 innings and finished with a record of 1-4 as the Reds finished 76-86, failing to make the playoffs. https://www.baseball-reference.com/players/l/lecursa01.shtml

For the 2015 season, LeCure did not make the Reds' opening day roster. He was optioned to Triple-A Louisville after Spring Training. He elected free agency on November 6, 2015.

Arizona Diamondbacks
LeCure joined the Arizona Diamondbacks for 2016 spring training, and was released on March 28, 2016.

Los Angeles Dodgers
LeCure signed a minor league contract with the Los Angeles Dodgers on April 7, 2016. He was 5–5 with a 4.55 ERA in 31 games (12 starts) for the AAA Oklahoma City Dodgers. He became a free agent on November 7, 2016.

Broadcasting career
In 2022 LeCure is in his fifth season as an analyst and co-host for the Cincinnati Reds Emmy Award-winning "Reds Live" pre-game and post-game shows on Bally Sports Ohio and part-time color analyst for select games on the Reds Radio Network.

Personal life
LeCure is the youngest of eight children.

References

External links

Living people
1984 births
Águilas Cibaeñas players
American expatriate baseball players in the Dominican Republic
Baseball players from Missouri
Billings Mustangs players
Chattanooga Lookouts players
Cincinnati Reds announcers
Cincinnati Reds players
Gigantes del Cibao players
Louisville Bats players
Major League Baseball broadcasters
Major League Baseball pitchers
Oklahoma City Dodgers players
Sarasota Reds players
Sportspeople from Jefferson City, Missouri
Surprise Rafters players
Texas Longhorns baseball players